Coulmiers is a commune in the Loiret department in north-central France.

History
This was the site of the defeat of the Prussian Army in the Battle of Coulmiers, November 9, 1870.

See also
Communes of the Loiret department

References

Communes of Loiret